Alexander William Lowndes de Waal (born 22 February 1963), a British researcher on African elite politics, is the executive director of the World Peace Foundation at the Fletcher School of Law and Diplomacy at Tufts University. Previously, he was a fellow of the Harvard Humanitarian Initiative at Harvard University, as well as program director at the Social Science Research Council on AIDS in New York City.

Childhood and education

He is the son of Esther Aline (née Lowndes-Moir), a writer on religion, and Rev. Dr Victor de Waal, Dean of Canterbury from 1976 to 1986. His siblings include barrister John de Waal, ceramic artist and writer Edmund de Waal, and Caucasus expert Thomas de Waal.

In 1988, de Waal received a D.Phil in social anthropology at Nuffield College, Oxford for his thesis on the 1984-5 Darfur famine in Sudan. This research formed the basis of his book, Famine That Kills: Darfur, Sudan (1989). The following year he joined the Africa division of Human Rights Watch, only to resign in December 1992 in protest against HRW's support for the United States' military involvement in Somalia.

Human rights activism
De Waal was the chairman of the Mines Advisory Group between 1993 and 1998. In 1997, the Mines Advisory Group was co-recipient of the Nobel Peace Prize as a founding member of the International Campaign to Ban Landmines.

De Waal set up two human rights organisations, African Rights (1993) and Justice Africa (1999), focusing respectively on documenting human rights abuses and developing policies to respond to human rights crises, notably in Rwanda, Somalia and Sudan. His book, Famine Crimes: Politics and the Disaster Relief Industry was published in 1997. Foreign Affairs described the book as "A powerful critique of the international humanitarian agencies dominating famine relief in Africa." African Rights, which mainly dealt with the situation in Rwanda, has later come under criticism. Luc Reydams argued in 2016 that "African Rights was instrumental in shaping and  spreading  an  easily  consumable  one-sided  narrative  of  the  Rwandan  conflict".

From 1997 to 2001, he focused on avenues to peaceful resolution of the Second Sudanese Civil War.  In 2001, he returned to his work on health in Africa, writing on the intersection of HIV/AIDS, poverty and drought.  As the conflict worsened in 2004, he returned to his doctoral thesis topic of Darfur. During 2005 and 2006, de Waal was seconded to the African Union mediation team for Darfur. In 2008 he became well known as a critic of the International Criminal Court's decision to seek an arrest warrant for Sudanese president Omar al Bashir, arguing that while Bashir was guilty of heinous crimes the 14 July 2008 Public Application charging him was poorly written and too weak to achieve a conviction. Additionally, he believed that the "ICC arrest warrant will lead to pre-emptive military action in Darfur, a reversal of the recent gains for civil and political rights, further restrictions on the UN and humanitarian operations, and an end to the [Comprehensive Peace Agreement of 2004]".

During 2005–06, de Waal was seconded to the African Union mediation team for Darfur, and from 2009–12 served as senior adviser to the African Union High-Level Implementation Panel for Sudan. He was on the list of Foreign Policy's 100 most influential public intellectuals in 2008 and Atlantic Monthly's 27 "brave thinkers" in 2009.

He is an editor of the African Arguments book series published by Zed Books with Richard Dowden, Director of the Royal African Society. de Waal also writes and published regular commentary on contemporary Sudan through his World Peace Foundation blog Reinventing Peace.

In November 2020 he wrote an article on the Tigray War involving Ethiopian federal powers and the TPLF, in which he quoted prime minister Abiy Ahmed calling the TPLF a criminal junta. He suggested the conflict would cause prospects for peace, democracy, and protection from famine to be set back a generation.

Interviews with former Tigray People's Liberation Front members
In the outset of the Tigray War, de Waal and Mulugeta Gebrehiwot published reports surrounding the situation in Tigray with regards to Eritrea's involvement.

Published works

Books 
 Famine that Kills : Darfur, Sudan, Oxford : Clarendon Press, 1989,  (Revised edition, 2005)
 War in Sudan: An Analysis of Conflict, London : Peace in Sudan Group, 1990
 Evil days : thirty years of war and famine in Ethiopia, New York: Human Rights Watch, 1991, 
 Facing Genocide: The Nuba of Sudan, London: African Rights, July 1995, 
 Famine crimes : politics & the disaster relief industry in Africa, London : African Rights & the International African Institute, 1997, 
 Who fights? who cares?: war and humanitarian action in Africa, editor, Trenton, NJ: Africa World Press, 2000, 
 The Phoenix State: Civil Society and the Future of Sudan, Editor with A.H. Abdel Salam, 2001, 
 Demilitarizing the mind: African agendas for peace and security, Editor, Trenton, NJ & Asmara, Eritrea : Africa World Press, 2002, 
 Young Africa: realising the rights of children and youth, Editor with Nicolas Argenti, Trenton, NJ: Africa World Press, 2002, 
 When peace comes: civil society and development in Sudan, Editor with Yoanes Ajawin, Trenton, NJ: Africa World Press, 2002, 
 Islamism and its enemies in the Horn of Africa, Editor, Bloomington: Indiana University Press, 2004, 
 Darfur : a short history of a long war, With Julie Flint, New York : Zed Books, 2005, 
 AIDS and power : Why there is no political crisis—yet, New York : Zed Books, 2006, 
 War in Darfur and the search for peace (edited), Cambridge : Harvard University Press, 2007, 
 The real politics of the Horn of Africa: Money, war and the business of power, Polity Press, 2015, 
 Advocacy in Conflict: Critical Perspectives on Transnational Activism (edited), Zed Books.
 Mass Starvation: The History and Future of Famine, Polity Press, 2017 
New Pandemics, Old Politics: Two Hundred Years of War on Disease and its Alternatives - Polity Books (2021)

References

External links 
 Alex de Waal's bio
 

1963 births
Living people
British expatriate academics in the United States
People of the War in Darfur
Harvard University faculty
British Africanists
British human rights activists
Writers about Africa
British non-fiction writers
Ephrussi family
English people of Dutch descent
English people of Austrian-Jewish descent
The Fletcher School at Tufts University faculty
British male writers
Alumni of Nuffield College, Oxford
Male non-fiction writers